Frederic Boyenga Bofala (born February 3, 1960) is a Doctor in public international law and former teacher-researcher to the university of Lille 2.

Boyenga Bofala was born in Mbandaka in Équateur Province. In 2001 he created, and today leads, the Union for the Republic National Movement - UNIR NM (Union pour la Republique Mouvement National - UNIR MN), political party in the Democratic Republic of Congo (DRC), officially recorded in DRC by the ministerial decree N°130 of 7 April 2005 in accordance with the law on the political parties.

Publications 
Frederic Boyenga-Bofala published:
 In the Name of Congo Zaire, in January 2012,
 Congo-Zaire - Remaking the Republic: crowned mission of a generation, in July 2001,
 Diary for the re-establishment and the maintenance of peace in the area of the large-Lakes, the restoration of the territorial integrity and the re-establishment of the Republic in Congo-Zaire, in March 2002,
 Congo-Zaire - Our Cause: The message and ambitions of a right cause, in January 2003.

See also 
 Union for the Republic National Movement - UNIR NM

External links
 Boyenga Bofala  official site (in French)
 Union for the Republic National Movement - UNIR NM official site (in French)
 Mokengeli  - UNIR MN'S Media Arm (in French)

1960 births
Living people
People from Mbandaka
Union for the Republic – National Movement politicians
21st-century Democratic Republic of the Congo people